Tropidia flavimana is a species of hoverfly in the family Syrphidae.

Distribution
Chile, Argentina.

References

Eristalinae
Diptera of South America
Taxa named by Rodolfo Amando Philippi
Insects described in 1865